KYLW (1450 AM) was a radio station licensed to Lockwood, Montana, United States. The station served the Billings area. The station was owned by Sun Mountain, Inc.

History
On November 28, 2016, KYLW returned to the air with a rhythmic contemporary format, branded as "Wild 104.5" (simulcast on FM translator K283CP Billings).

KYLW's license was canceled on April 26, 2017 for not fully paying debts it owed to the Federal Communications Commission (FCC).

KYLW filed a Petition for Reconsideration on May 26, 2017, which was granted on June 9, 2017. The renewal application and license authorization were also granted, and the callsign was reinstated on June 9, 2017.

Due to the loss of its licensed transmitter site, on April 26, 2017 KYLW requested special temporary authority to operate with an emergency antenna and reduced power from an alternate site location. The request was granted on June 14, 2017.

On November 29, 2018, KYLW was taken off the air and its license was deleted by the FCC because it had no tower and was broadcasting illegally for years, along with sister station KBSR.

Previous logos

References

External link
FCC Station Search Details: DKYLW (Facility ID: 129384)

YLW
Radio stations established in 2005
2005 establishments in Montana
Defunct radio stations in the United States
Radio stations disestablished in 2018
2018 disestablishments in Montana
YLW